Alfa TV is a privately owned TV station in North Macedonia. Its headquarters is in Skopje, and the program director until 2018 was Ljubomir Nikolovski. Since 2018, the director is Vasko Eftov.

The station is considered to be supportive of former Prime Minister Nikola Gruevski of the VMRO-DPMNE party and to be majority-owned by Peter Schatz, a Hungarian media tycoon closely allied with Hungarian Prime Minister Viktor Orbán. The station and the Schatz-owned web portal Ripostmk.com are currently under investigation by North Macedonian authorities due to running expensive ads worth €3.2 million for small Hungarian companies linked to Schatz and to have used the money to push support for Gruevski in 2017, while disproportionally undermining the government of Zoran Zaev.

Alfa TV has also received criticism from the civic fact-checking organization F2N2 for promoting misinformation concerning foreign investment and Russian influence in the country.

Alfa TV has been Broadcast for Spanish League La Liga

Line-up

News shows

 Balances (Macedonian: Биланси)
 News (Macedonian: Вести )
 Evropanorama (Macedonian: Европанорама)

Alfa TV Production

 Heath factor (Macedonian: Фактор здравје)
 Day is starting (Macedonian: Почнува ден)
 Puls with Ana Jovkovska (Macedonian: „Пулс“ со Ана Јовковска)
 Planet football (Macedonian: Планет фудбал)
 Alfa TV Concerts (Macedonian: Алфа ТВ Концерти)
 Peninsula (Macedonian: Полуостров)
 Mokosh (Macedonian: Мокош)
Spanish League (Macedonian Шпанска лига) - La Liga

Entertainment

 Sunny steps (Macedonian: Сунчане скале)
 Host, get married! (Macedonian: Домаќине, ожени се!)
 Evening with Vesna (Macedonian: Вечер со Весна - ток шоу)
 One kiss - Top list (Macedonian: Еден бакнеж - Топ листа)
 Labor Action (Macedonia: Работна акција - реалити шоу)
 Mission [Im]possible (Macedonian: [Не]возможна мисија)
 Down, Down (Macedonian: Зајди, зајди)
 Show of all times (Macedonian: Шоу на сите времиња)
 One on One (Macedonian: Еден на еден)

Foreign TV Shows

 Brazil Avenue (Macedonia: Авенија на љубовта)
 Stolen Love (Macedonian: Украдена љубов)
 Secrets (Macedonian: Тајни)
 Sisters (Macedonian: Сестри)
 Jurnal of Feride (Macedonian: Дневникот на Фериде)
 The Company (Macedonian: Компанијата)
 Mahmut and Meriem (Macedonian: Махмут и Мерием)
 Folk (Macedonian: Фолк)
 Abyss of love (Macedonian: Амбис на љубовта)
 Rejected (Macedonian: Отфрлена)

Documentary

 Alfa action (Macedonian:Алфа акција)
 Unit (Macedonian: Единица)
 Unaired stories (Macedonian: Необјавени приказни)
 Family secrets (Macedonian: Семејни тајни - нова сезона)
 Miscalls of Jesus (Macedonian: Чудата на Исус)
 Atenbrough: 60 years if the wild (Macedonian: Атенбороу: 60 години во дивината)
 Ice planet (Macedonian: Ледена планета)
 Europe: A Natural History (Macedonian: Дивата Европа)
 Opus Dei - Code of DaVinci (Macedonian: Опус Деи - Кодот на Да Винчи)
 Survival - Marine sniper (Macedonian: Преживување - Маринец снајперист)

External links
 Website

References

Television channels in North Macedonia